The French River is a river in Central Ontario, Canada. It flows  from Lake Nipissing west to Georgian Bay. The river largely follows the boundary between the Parry Sound District and the Sudbury District, and in most contexts is considered the dividing line between Northern and Southern Ontario. The French River was designated a Canadian Heritage River in 1986.

Geography

The French River flows through typical Canadian Shield country, in many places exposing rugged glaciated rock but also through heavily forested areas on the upper portion. The mouth of the river contains countless islands and numerous channels which vary from narrow, enclosed steep-walled gorges, falls and rapids, to broad expanses of open water.

Tributaries of this river include the:
Wanapitei River
Pillow River
Murdock River
Wolseley River
Little French River
Pickerel River
Restoule River
Hall River

History

It was used as a transportation corridor by the Algonquian peoples of this region. The Ojibwa named it Wemitigoj-Sibi. It became known to Europeans as the "French River" because it became associated with French explorers of the 17th century, including Étienne Brûlé, Samuel de Champlain and Pierre-Esprit Radisson, and missionaries.

Other explorers who later followed this route included Simon Fraser, Alexander Mackenzie and David Thompson.

Together with the Ottawa and Mattawa Rivers, the French River formed part of the water highway from Montreal to Lake Superior in the days of the fur trade. It remained a major canoe route until about 1820. Around 1855, the Grand Trunk Railway provided newfound access to the area and the Georgian Bay. This led to increased exploration and interest for fishing and logging during the era of the Industrial Revolution. After the Great Chicago Fire in 1871, there was a boom in logging along with the creation of Lumber barons in the Great Lakes. The French River was "ripe for the picking with its seemingly inexhaustible supply of timber and proximity to the American markets".

Near the end of the 19th century, logging became the primary activity in the area. It was later settled as a summer tourist and recreation area. For this reason, the French River was designated a Canadian Heritage River in 1985. Because of the rugged nature of the Canadian Shield country surrounding this river, large parts of this river remain relatively untouched and it is now a popular location for recreational canoeing, kayaking, photography, camping, fishing and boating.

Following bouts of overfishing, in the 1994 the Ontario Ministry of Natural Resources placed a slot limit on fishing to protect prime breeding year classes and increase the trophy fish population in the French River.

French River Waterway Provincial Park

Most of the river's shores from Lake Nipissing to the Georgian Bay, except for the land occupied by the Dokis First Nation between the Upper and Lower French River, have been protected and designated as a provincial waterway park. There are 230 undeveloped back-country campsites available in the park along the river. French River continues to attract vacationers and cottage owners who enjoy the clear water, rocky shores and pine growth forests.

See also
List of rivers of Ontario
French River, Ontario

References

Further reading

External links

Ontario Parks French River website
CHRS French River website

French River (Ontario)
Canadian Heritage Rivers
Rivers of Nipissing District
Rivers of Sudbury District
Tributaries of Georgian Bay
Rivers of Parry Sound District